The canton of Avranches is an administrative division of the Manche department, northwestern France. Its borders were modified at the French canton reorganisation which came into effect in March 2015. Its seat is in Avranches.

It consists of the following communes:

Avranches (partly)
Bacilly
Carolles
Champeaux
Chavoy
Dragey-Ronthon
Genêts
Jullouville
Lolif
Marcey-les-Grèves
Le Parc
Ponts
Saint-Jean-de-la-Haize
Saint-Jean-le-Thomas
Saint-Pierre-Langers
Sartilly-Baie-Bocage
Vains

References

Cantons of Manche